Raub District is a district in Pahang, Malaysia. Located in the west of Pahang, the district bordered Lipis District, Jerantut District, 
Temerloh District, Bentong District  and Hulu Selangor District of Selangor clockwisely. Raub district consists of 7 mukim (sub-districts), namely Batu Talam, Sega, Semantan Ulu, Dong, Ulu Dong, Gali and Tras. With an area of 2,271 km², Raub district is situated in west of Pahang and between two range, Titiwangsa Range and Benom Mountain Range. Raub district also is home to Fraser's Hill. The administrative seat of this district is the town of Raub.

Demographics

The following is based on Department of Statistics Malaysia 2010 census.

Federal Parliament and State Assembly Seats

Raub district representative in the Federal Parliament (Dewan Rakyat)

List of Raub district representatives in the State Legislative Assembly (Dewan Undangan Negeri)

Subdistricts

Raub District is divided into 7 mukims, which are:
 Batu Talam (57,000 Ha)
 Dong (7,500 Ha)
 Gali (65,300 Ha)(Capital)
 Hulu Dong (19,200 Ha)
 Sega (15,500 Ha)
 Semantan Hulu (33,400 Ha)
 Teras (29,000 Ha)

Townships
Raub
Tras
Batu Talam
Dong
Sang Lee
Sungai Chetang
Fraser's Hill
Bukit Koman
Simpang Kalang
Cheroh
Batu 12
Sempalit
Sungai Ruan
Sungai Krau
Sungai Lui
Sungai Chalit
Jenud
Sega Lama
Ulu Renggol
Jeruas
Sengkela
Chenua
Kuala Atok
Ulu Atok
Jeram Besu
Felda Krau
Felda Tersang
Pos Buntu
Felda Lembah Klau

See also
 Districts of Malaysia

References

External links 
Official website of Raub District Council